Laraine Stephens is an American actress.

Stephens was born in Oakland, California. She studied at both Los Angeles City College and the University of California, Los Angeles.

A coloratura soprano, Stephens performed in operas before moving into acting.

On television, Stephens played Diane Waring in Bracken's World, Irene Stefan in Eischied, Claire Kronski in Matt Helm, Susan Wentworth in O.K. Crackerby, Claire Estep in Rich Man, Poor Man Book II, and Dr. Karen Fletcher in Women in White.

She also appeared in the TV series Leave It to Beaver, Surfside 6, The Many Loves of Dobie Gillis, Laramie, Laredo, The F.B.I., Tarzan, The Name of the Game, I Dream of Jeannie, Love, American Style, Nanny and the Professor, Cade's County, The Mod Squad, Marcus Welby, M.D., Mission: Impossible, Mannix, McCloud, Barnaby Jones, Cannon, Movin' On, The Quest, Police Story, Police Woman, Hawaii Five-O, The Next Step Beyond, Vegas, The Love Boat, T. J. Hooker, Seven Brides for Seven Brothers and Fantasy Island, among others. She appeared in the films 40 Guns to Apache Pass; Hellfighters; and The Thousand Plane Raid; and in the TV movies The Screaming Woman; Adventures of Nick Carter; Jarrett; The Girl on the Late, Late Show; The Rangers; Risko; The Courage and the Passion; Crash; Dallas Cowboys Cheerleaders; Dallas Cowboys Cheerleaders II; Power; and Scruples.

In 1964, Sinatra Enterprises signed Stephens for a role in the film None but the Brave.

On June 12, 1970, Stephens married producer David Gerber. The couple operated Gerber Vineyards.

References

External links
 
 

Living people
20th-century American actresses
American film actresses
American television actresses
Actresses from Oakland, California
American opera singers
21st-century American women
1941 births